The 1902 Florida State College football team represented Florida State College in the sport of American football during the 1902 college football season. The team was the first intercollegiate football squad to represent Florida State University and was led by head coach W. W. Hughes. The team posted a 2–1 record and won the State Championship. With no formal nickname or mascot, the Florida State College football team was known simply as e. g. the "Florida State College Eleven".

Before the season

Uniforms
The Florida State players wore gold uniforms with a large purple F on the front. Their pants were lightly padded, but their upper bodies were largely unprotected. Leather helmets with ear guards covered their heads, and shoehorn-shaped metal nose guards were strapped across their faces.

Schedule

Season summary

Week 1: Bainbridge Giants
The red and white clad Bainbridge Giants arrived by train, and they reportedly hoped to "hammer the life" out of Florida State. The Giants were "much heavier" than Florida State and had four football veterans from the University of Georgia, as well as one University of Virginia alumnus.

The two teams trotted onto the field at 3:30 p.m. According to a reporter from the Weekly Tallahasseean, Florida State moved the ball quickly into Giant territory. After several "buck runs" Florida State was "within six inches of Georgia's goal." The Giants held Florida State for two downs, but on the third Buchholz "barely pushed through Georgia's right tackle for a touchdown." Provence attempted an extra-point kick, but it failed. After sixteen minutes of action, Florida State led 5-0. Before the ball again was "advanced any great distance by either side," the first half ended.

McCord, of Florida State, kicked off the second half sending "the pigskin spinning to Georgia's twenty yard line." Bainbridge did not advance the ball, and Florida State took possession at mid-field. After several "line bucks," Florida State was at the Giant's twenty-yard line. There, Florida State turned the ball over on downs, and Bainbridge started marching up the field. Jacques, the Giant's right halfback, made a twenty-yard end run, the teams "only long gain of the game." With Bainbridge on Florida State's fifteen yard line, "things began to look black for Florida State." But, "the Florida State line held firm" and the Giant's field goal attempt "was foiled." Following Bainbridge's failed offensive, "the whistle was blown" and the game ended. Florida State had defeated the Bainbridge Giants 5-0.

Week 2: Florida Agricultural College
On December 12, Florida State met Florida Agricultural College on a rain-soaked field in Tallahassee. FAC kicked off into the "wind and rain." Florida State moved forward, but the ball "was forcibly taken from left halfback Williams arms by one of the Florida players." Florida quickly fumbled the ball, and "Williams, of Florida State dropped on it." Florida State tried to advance, but Florida "woke up and got into the game" by pushing Florida State back. After several possession changes, FAC made some "end runs" putting them on the Florida State four-yard line. FAC then "pushed over the goal line for a touchdown," but the extra-point attempt was a "miserable failure." At the end of the first half, FAC led Florida State 5-0.

During the second half FAC players "seemed to be getting tired," reported the Weekly Tallahasseean, while the Florida State players "were still fresh." The FAC players began "slugging" the Florida State players. The "dirty work" started when Taylor, Florida's quarterback, struck Florida State's right end J.T. Howard "in the temple and was promptly disqualified." FAC also suffered a five-yard penalty. Florida State pushed forward, Murray "took twenty yards around the right end," and Buchholz "went through the center for five yards." With the ball on FAC's sixteen-yard line, FAC was penalized for improper formation and lost five yards. Then Clark, Florida State's quarterback, "called his off-side trick play." FAC was "caught napping" and lost another five yards. FAC immediately protested, but the referee would not relent. In response, the FAC players "held a caucus" and decided "to leave the field." The officials asked the Florida players to return to the field, but it "refused to do so." The referee revoked FAC's touchdown and gave it to Florida State. The game was forfeited in favor of Florida State 6-0.

Week 3: Florida Agricultural College
The Florida State and Florida Agricultural teams met again at the Baseball Park in Lake City on December 20. The game started at 3:00 p.m. "Although it was hotly contested from the first," the Lake City newspaper stated, "it was plain that the local team was stronger." FAC's C.H. Maguire ran twenty yards for a touchdown, and the extra point conversion was successful.

"The second half was more or less a rendition of the first," according to the Weekly Tallahasseean, and the game "resulted rather disastrously" for Florida State with a 6-0 loss.

Roster
The original line-up played the entire game, both offense and defense. Substitutes replaced injured players.

Line
LE - L.M. Murray
LT – E.P. Watson
LG – W. Mullin
C  – C.W. Peters
RG – G.P. McCord
RT – W.W. Dickey
RE - R.F. Bradford

Backfield
QB – A.B. Clark
LH - Dan Williams
RH - W.H. Provence
FB – Fritz Buchholz

References

Florida State
Florida State Seminoles football seasons
Florida State College football